Men's 50 metre rifle three positions (then known as free rifle) was one of the fifteen shooting events at the 1996 Summer Olympics. Both Jean-Pierre Amat and Sergey Belyayev reached a new Olympic record of 1175 points in the qualification round; Amat shot the better final and won the gold medal.

Qualification round

OR Olympic record – Q Qualified for final

Final

OR Olympic record

References

Sources

Shooting at the 1996 Summer Olympics
Men's 050m 3 positions 1996
Men's events at the 1996 Summer Olympics